Ramanathapuram is a village in Dindigul District, Tamil Nadu, India.

It is about 5 km from Vadamadurai.

Villages in Dindigul district